Frederick Thomas Pilkington (1832-1898), pupil of his father, was a "Rogue" British architect, practising in the Victorian High Gothic revival style. He designed mostly churches and institutional buildings in Scotland. Typical of his work is the Barclay Church in Edinburgh, a polychrome stone structure with early French Gothic details.

Life

Pilkington was one of several children to Thomas Pilkington, architect, and Jane Butterworth of Stamford, England. The family moved to Edinburgh in 1854. In 1855 T. Pilkington & Son, architects and surveyors, were living and working at 10 Dundas Street in Edinburgh's Second New Town.

Pilkington studied mathematics under Professor Philip Kelland at the University of Edinburgh, passed his exams in 1858 and was Hamilton prizewinner in Logic, but did not bother to graduate. He signed the University Matriculation Register 1856/7 as of Stamford.

Pilkington married in 1858 and lived at Mary Cottage in the suburb of Trinity in the north of Edinburgh. His wife died in childbirth in March 1861 and Pilkington remarried to Elizabeth Cropley from Ely, Cambridgeshire in August 1861 with whom he raised a family of five children, living successively in Cumin Place, Eton Terrace, Egremont House in Dick Place which he built for himself. His family comprised Ernest born 1864, architect, died during the First World War, Maud Elizabeth, a miniaturist; Ethel Mary; Mabel Jane; and Frederick Percy, born 1874.

In later life Pilkington lived in 17 Carlton Terrace on Calton Hill. This is a Georgian townhouse by the architect William Henry Playfair rather than a building of his own design.

After an illustrious but troubled professional life Pilkington returned to London, England in 1883 and died in Pinner on 18 September 1898, leaving £6,609 (Probate November 1899).

Architect
 

Pilkington adhered closely to Ruskin's principles, and in the High Victorian tradition which they promoted he evolved a highly personal style by mixing northern medieval elements with those from the Gothic architecture of Northern Italy as published by John Ruskin and George Edmund Street. His work featured polychrome stone, chunky rustication and lavish external carving of Venetian medieval buildings combined with French rose windows, decorated tracery, high-pitched roofs and deep, rain-conscious porches.

In 1854 Pilkington's practice exhibited designs for a church and workers' housing at the Royal Scottish Academy in Edinburgh. After attending the University of Edinburgh in 1858 he designed and built Inchglass, a large Gothic Revival villa at Crieff, Tayside.

By 1860 Pilkington had secured the patronage of the papermakers John and Charles Cowan in Penicuik and in 1861 secured their commission for the Scottish National Institution for the Education of Imbecile Children at Larbert, Falkirk. Approximately five years later he also obtained the patronage of Henry Ballantyne (1802-1865) to build villas for the Ballantyne family in Walkerburn, and to design and build a new village with houses for the Ballantyne mill workers. Two of the villas, The Kirna (1867) and Stoneyhill (1868) were characterized by richly sculptured Venetian Romanesque designs, with Moorish influences. These designs were also found in his own house Egremont (1865), 38 Dick Place, Edinburgh and Craigmount Park (1869).

Between 1861 and 1866 Pilkington secured commissions for Trinity Church (1861-3), Irvine, Strathclyde, The Moray Free Church (1862), Edinburgh, South Church (1862-3), Penicuik, Lothian, and St John's (1862-6), Edenside, Kelso, Borders. The most dramatic was the Barclay-Bruntsfield Church (1862-4), Edinburgh, with its landmark spire, unprecedented conical cluster of prismatic sections crowning the apses of the heart-shaped plan. All follow the same basic concept of a large galleried auditorium, transformed to a Greek cross at the upper level. All his churches of this period include rich naturalistic carving, including some of his smaller designs at Auchengray (c. 1865), Strathclyde, and Innerleithen (c. 1865), Borders.

By the mid-1860's his earlier use of polychrome masonry was replaced by more conventional plans last at Windsor Place Church (1866), Cardiff, Glamorgan.

In 1867 he went into partnership with John Murray Bell (1839-1877) to form Pilkington & Bell, Bell providing the structural know-how, Pilkington providing the design flair.

At the Eastern Club (1868), Dundee, Pilkington combines Romanesque and Renaissance motifs. By 1874 at Dean Park House, Edinburgh, he turned to a giant-scales contemporary French style.

In 1883, Pilkington moved to London after he was commissioned to work the Army and Navy Hotel (1180-2), Victoria Street. His move to London did not lead to any other major commissions. His practice transitioned to designing residential flats for both the Artisans, Labourers & General Dwellings Company and for the middle-classes.  This second category of flats include Campden Hill Court, Kensington and York Mansions, Battersea.

Pilkington did not see the completion of York Mansions, his last commission, as he died before its completion in 1901.

Notable buildings

Buildings in Edinburgh

Barclay Church 1862-4
38 Dick Place (Pilkington's own house which he called Egremont, built within the Grange Park House estate), 1865–1870
48–50 Dick Place, 1864
158–164 Grove Street, 1864
Craigend Park (Kingston Clinic), 1867–69
1–7 Coltbridge Terrace, 1869
129–131 Grange Loan, 1872
Daniel Stewart's Boarding House (formerly Dean Park House), 1874
3 Queensferry Terrace, Dean Park House Stable Block, 1874
8 Spylaw Road, mid-1870s
39–51 Deanhaugh Street, 1880–81
Moray Free Church, South Back of the Canongate, 1862
New Free Church, Viewforth (then Viewforth St. Oswald's),1871

Elsewhere in Scotland

Auchengray Church, by Carnwath, South Lanarkshire, 1864-5
Trinity Church, Irvine, Ayrshire, 1861–63, currently on the Buildings at Risk register for Scotland.
Free Church, Innerleithen, Scottish Borders, (1864–67), still in use.
St. John's Edenside, Kelso, Roxburghshire, 1863-6
The Kirna in Walkerburn (1867)
Penicuik Old South Church (1862)
Park End in Penicuik (1862)
Sunnybrae Lodge and Stables, Walkerburn, 1868
Spier's school, Beith, Ayrshire. Memorial shrine to John Spier.
Marine Hotel in North Berwick
St Aidan's Church (United Presbyterian Church) in Morebattle, Scottish Borders, 1864/5.
McCheyne Memorial Church, Perth Road, Dundee (1868–71)
St. Mark's, Greenfield, Dundee, Angus, 1868
Simson Memorial West Kilbride Cemetery, a memorial dedicated to Dr. Robert Simson, a mathematician born in the town
New Parish Church, Lamlash, Arran, 1871
 United Presbyterian Church, Dudhope Crescent, Dundee, 1877
 Inchglas, Broich Terrace, Crieff, 1856

Outside Scotland
City United Reformed Church (The New Presbyterian Church), Cardiff, Wales, 1867

Gallery

References

Gothic Revival architects
Scottish ecclesiastical architects
1832 births
1898 deaths
19th-century Scottish architects